Kinogama is an unincorporated place and railway point in geographic de Gaulle Township in the Unorganized North Part of Sudbury District in Northeastern Ontario, Canada. It is on a left tributary creek just west of the Kinogama River in the James Bay drainage basin.

Kinogama is on the Canadian Pacific Railway transcontinental main line, between the railway point of Tophet to the west and the community of Kormak to the east. Kinogama railway station is located on this line and is served by the Via Rail Sudbury – White River train.

References

Communities in Sudbury District